Michael Sven Sukkar (born 11 September 1981) is an Australian politician who served as the Assistant Treasurer and Minister for Housing from 2019, and as the Minister for Homelessness, Social and Community Housing from 2020. He lost his ministries in May 2022, when the Liberal Party went into Opposition on the election of the Albanese Labor Government. 

Sukkar has been a member of the House of Representatives since September 2013, representing the Division of Deakin in Victoria for the Liberal Party.

Early life and background 

Sukkar was born in the eastern Melbourne suburb of Ringwood, to a father who was born in Lebanon. Sukkar attended primary school at Sacred Heart in Croydon and then secondary school at Aquinas College in Ringwood. He completed a Bachelor of Laws and Bachelor of Commerce at Deakin University in 2004 and Master of Laws at the University of Melbourne in 2010.

In 2005 Sukkar worked as a taxation consultant at accounting firm PricewaterhouseCoopers. From 2006 he spent seven years working as a tax lawyer with the firm Blake Dawson Waldron (now known as Ashurst Australia) where he was a senior associate.

In 2008 Sukkar suffered a cardiac arrest while playing basketball, and was treated by a nurse and anaesthetist who were at the game and an off-duty paramedic who was nearby. Sukkar later advocated for defibrillators when elected to parliament.

Political career

Entry to Parliament 
In 2012, Sukkar was endorsed as the Liberal Party candidate for the marginal seat of Deakin. He won the seat at the 2013 election with a swing to the Liberal Party of 3.8 points, succeeding Labor MP Mike Symon he joined the government benches of the Abbott Government. Sukkar served on a number of parliamentary committees in this Parliament, such as the Chairman of the Parliamentary Joint Committee on Intelligence and Security. In 2014 Sukkar launched the Deakin 200 Club with other conservative Liberal MPs to fundraise for marginal seats held by conservatives within the party.

Turnbull Government and first ministry 

At the 2016 federal election, Sukkar increased his margin by 2.5 points, the Liberal Party's largest swing in Victoria. On 24 January 2017, Prime Minister Malcolm Turnbull, appointed Sukkar to the ministry as Assistant Minister to the Treasurer. Turnbull gave Sukkar responsibility for addressing housing affordability. When asked about housing affordability on 20 February 2017, Sukkar told Sky News that "we're also enabling young people to get highly paid jobs which is the first step to buying a house". Labor MP Tim Watts said in response that the remarks showed the Coalition was "back to where Joe Hockey started on housing affordability".

In June 2017 Sukkar, Greg Hunt, and Alan Tudge faced the possibility of prosecution for contempt of court after criticising a court's sentencing of terrorists. They avoided prosecution by making an unconditional apology to the Victorian Court of Appeal.

Morrison Government and return to ministry 
Sukkar supported Minister for Home Affairs Peter Dutton during the Liberal leadership spill in August 2018, and had a pivotal role in removing then-Prime Minister Malcolm Turnbull. However, Scott Morrison defeated both figures, becoming Prime Minister leaving Sukkar on the back benches. Opinion polls indicated that only 47% of the two-party-preferred vote would go Sukkar's way. Despite this, in the May 2019 federal election he was re-elected for a third term, albeit with a reduced margin of 4.8%. Sukkar was not given a ministry by Scott Morrison until after the May election, when he was given the role of Assistant Treasurer.

Sukkar was accused of branch stacking, of which he was cleared of "serious misuse" of Commonwealth funds when it moved to formal investigation. However the inquiry did not interview any witnesses or staff from the electoral offices. In 2021, further allegations of branch stacking were aired by 60 Minutes and the Nine newspapers against Sukkar and Marcus Bastiaan, which Sukkar denied. In January 2021, the Australian Broadcasting Corporation reported that the Australian Security Intelligence Organisation (ASIO) was investigating a donor with ties to Sukkar over foreign interference risks.

In December 2020, Sukkar was given further responsibilities, being sworn in to the roles of Assistant Treasurer, Minister for Housing and Minister for Homelessness, Social and Community Housing.

Shadow Cabinet 
At the 2022 Australian federal election, Sukkar held his seat by fewer than 500 votes, making it the most marginal Liberal seat in the nation. Upon the defeat of the Coalition, he was appointed as the Shadow Minister for Social Services by Opposition Leader Peter Dutton in June of that year.

Political views 
Sukkar is a member of the National Right faction of the Liberal Party.

In his maiden speech, Sukkar categorised himself as an "economic liberal" and with "strong conservative foundations". He credited his Catholic religion as being one of the two most significant influences in his life, in addition to his family. In 2013, he expressed support for the school chaplaincy program at an Australian Christian Lobby forum.

Sukkar opposed same-sex marriage during the Australian Marriage Law Postal Survey. Although initially stating he would follow the outcome of the survey, Sukkar abstained from the vote despite his electorate voting 66% in favour, saying that he could not support the bill. 

Sukkar also intervened during the development of the 2021 Australian census to exclude questions about gender and sexuality despite these being recommended for inclusion by the Australian Bureau of Statistics.

Personal life 
Sukkar married Anna Duthie in 2010. They have two sons, Leo and Nathan.

References

External links
 Official site

|-

|-

|-

1981 births
Living people
Liberal Party of Australia members of the Parliament of Australia
Members of the Australian House of Representatives
Members of the Australian House of Representatives for Deakin
Australian people of Lebanese descent
Australian people of Norwegian descent
21st-century Australian politicians
Turnbull Government
Government ministers of Australia